Baudin Island is a small island (20ha, 50acres) in Henri Freycinet Harbour, the southern part of Shark Bay in Western Australia.

The island was named after the French explorer Nicolas Baudin who passed through the region.

It is also a reserve with the name Baudin Island Nature Reserve within the Shark Bay Marine Park and Shark Bay World Heritage area.

See also
 List of islands in Shark Bay

References

Islands of Shark Bay